

Crown
Head of State - Queen Elizabeth II

Federal government
Governor General - Ray Hnatyshyn

Cabinet
Prime Minister -  Brian Mulroney
Deputy Prime Minister - Don Mazankowski
Minister of Finance - Don Mazankowski
Secretary of State for External Affairs - Barbara McDougall
Minister of National Defence - Marcel Masse
Minister of National Health and Welfare - Benoît Bouchard
Minister of Industry, Science and Technology - Michael Wilson
Minister of the Environment - Jean Charest
Minister of Justice - Kim Campbell
Minister of Transport - Jean Corbeil
Minister of Communications - Perrin Beatty
Minister of Fisheries and Oceans - John Crosbie
Minister of Agriculture - Bill McKnight
Minister of Public Works - Elmer MacKay
Minister of Employment and Immigration - Bernard Valcourt
Minister of Energy, Mines and Resources - Jake Epp
Minister of Forestry - Frank Oberle
Minister of Veterans Affairs - Gerry Merrithew

Parliament
See: 34th Canadian parliament

Party leaders
Progressive Conservative Party of Canada -  Brian Mulroney
Liberal Party of Canada - Jean Chrétien
Bloc Québécois - Lucien Bouchard
New Democratic Party- Audrey McLaughlin
Reform Party of Canada - Preston Manning

Supreme Court Justices
Chief Justice: Antonio Lamer
Beverley McLachlin
Frank Iacobucci
William Stevenson then John C. Major
Gérard V. La Forest
John Sopinka
Peter deCarteret Cory
Claire L'Heureux-Dubé
Charles D. Gonthier

Other
Speaker of the House of Commons - John Allen Fraser
Governor of the Bank of Canada - John Crow
Chief of the Defence Staff - General John de Chastelain

Provinces

Premiers
Premier of Alberta - Don Getty then Ralph Klein
Premier of British Columbia - Mike Harcourt
Premier of Manitoba - Gary Filmon
Premier of New Brunswick - Frank McKenna
Premier of Newfoundland - Clyde Wells
Premier of Nova Scotia - Donald Cameron
Premier of Ontario - Bob Rae
Premier of Prince Edward Island - Joe Ghiz
Premier of Quebec - Robert Bourassa
Premier of Saskatchewan - Roy Romanow
Premier of the Northwest Territories - Nellie Cournoyea
Premier of Yukon - Tony Penikett then John Ostashek

Lieutenant-governors
Lieutenant-Governor of Alberta - Gordon Towers
Lieutenant-Governor of British Columbia - David Lam 
Lieutenant-Governor of Manitoba - George Johnson
Lieutenant-Governor of New Brunswick - Gilbert Finn
Lieutenant-Governor of Newfoundland and Labrador - Frederick Russell
Lieutenant-Governor of Nova Scotia - Lloyd Roseville Crouse
Lieutenant-Governor of Ontario - Hal Jackman
Lieutenant-Governor of Prince Edward Island - Marion Reid
Lieutenant-Governor of Quebec - Martial Asselin
Lieutenant-Governor of Saskatchewan - Sylvia Fedoruk

Mayors
Toronto - June Rowlands
Montreal - Jean Doré
Vancouver - Gordon Campbell
Ottawa - Jacquelin Holzman

Religious leaders
Roman Catholic Bishop of Quebec -  Archbishop Maurice Couture
Roman Catholic Bishop of Montreal -  Cardinal Archbishop Jean-Claude Turcotte
Roman Catholic Bishops of London - Bishop John Michael Sherlock
Moderator of the United Church of Canada - Walter H. Farquharson then Stan McKay

See also
1991 Canadian incumbents
Events in Canada in 1993
1993 Canadian incumbents
Governmental leaders in 1992
 Canadian incumbents by year

1992
1992 in Canadian politics
Canadian leaders